"Papaoutai"  (French for "Dad, where are you?") is a song written and performed by Belgian singer Stromae. The song was released as a digital download in Belgium on 13 May 2013 as the lead single from his second studio album Racine carrée (2013). The song peaked at number one in Belgium and France and became the best selling single of 2013 in Belgium. A remix of the song featuring Angel Haze also appears on the album.

The song was performed live at the 2013 NRJ Music Awards, where it featured American rapper will.i.am. The song is also featured on the 2014 dancing game Just Dance 2015 for PAL regions and is available as DLC for NTSC regions.

Music video
The music video accompanying the release of "Papaoutai" was directed by Adam Nael and released on YouTube on 6 June 2013 at a total length of three minutes and fifty-two seconds. The video shows a young boy (played by Karl Ruben Noel) trying to interact with his father (played by Stromae), who sits motionless, his expression and body resembling that of a mannequin. Father and son are dressed in identical outfits consisting of garishly patterned aqua shirts and shorts, knee socks, and orange bowtie. The video has the ambiance and decor of the 1950s. The boy looks longingly through the window at other parents and children who likewise wear matching outfits that identify them as pairs: a mother and daughter dressed similarly to Dorothy Gale in The Wizard of Oz do a dance while walking their identical dogs; a garbageman and his son collect rubbish together while doing another dance; while still another father (played by Ceasare "Tight Eyez" Willis, one of the creators of Krumping) does an aggressive, threatening dance at his reluctant son before the boy finally begins to imitate him.

Frustrated, the son does various dances in front of his own father until one of his efforts provokes the father to smile. Outside, father and son do their own dance together, but it is soon revealed that the boy is dancing alone and his father is still stiff and unresponsive. In frustration, the son joins Stromae on the sofa, assuming a rigid, lifeless position identical to his father's. 

The song and video refer to the absence of Stromae's father—who had little presence in Stromae's life even before being killed in the 1994 Rwandan genocide—and to Stromae's fear of being unable to be an effective father with no memory of ever having a father of his own.<ref>Stromae: Disillusion, With a Dance Beat, by Scott Sayer, The New York Times, October 15, 2013]</ref> As of May 2022, the video has received over 900 million views on YouTube, and is the most popular Francophone video on the platform.

Lyrics and meaning

The title of the song is an intentionally misspelled form of the phrase , which translates as "Dad, where are you?"  also means "to trick someone" in old slang.

The lyrics of the song are about a boy living with his mother who suspects something is wrong when he no longer sees his father. The mother makes up excuses to try to prevent the narrator from discovering the truth about the whereabouts of his father of which even the mother is unaware.

The chorus of the song repeats the words Où t'es papa, où t'es?, translating to "Where are you Dad, where are you?" The song continues with the narrator pondering about the day he would become a father and the worries that would arise from the pressure of being a parent, as heard in the lines: Tout le monde sait comment on fait des bébés ; mais personne ne sait comment on fait des papas ("Everyone knows how to make babies; but no one knows how to make fathers"). His worries also consist of whether he will be loved or hated by his children and how he will be able to take up the role. From this, it goes back to the chorus and ends with a repetition of the song before the first chorus, going back to his interaction with his mother about the whereabouts of his father.

Covers and parody
American A cappella group Pentatonix and violinist Lindsey Stirling covered the song on Pentatonix's album PTX Vol. 3, released on 23 September 2014.

Erza Muqoli performed this song with self-accompaniment on piano for her audition for the ninth season (2014–2015) of the French television show La France a un incroyable talent.Lamaoutai (Llama, where are you?) is a spoof created in November 2013 about the kidnapping of Serge the Llama from a circus in Bordeaux.

Letícia Carvalho covered the song on The Voice Portugal on 11 October 2015.

Alexandre Heitz performed the song on The Voice of Germany on 2 October 2018.

Kenza Blanka covered the song on series 8 of The Voice UK'' on 9 February 2019, singing it in English and Arabic and French.

Track listing

Charts

Weekly charts

Year-end charts

Certifications

<--Post by François Delétraz a Figaro Magazine journalist-->

Release history

References

External links
  

2013 singles
Stromae songs
Songs about fathers
Eurodance songs
SNEP Top Singles number-one singles
Ultratop 50 Singles (Wallonia) number-one singles
2013 songs
Songs written by Stromae
Works about the Rwandan genocide